Bunshinsaba may refer to:
 Bunshinsaba (2004 film), a South Korean horror film
 Bunshinsaba (2012 film), a Chinese horror film